Mawson Glacier is a large glacier on the east coast of Victoria Land, Antarctica, descending eastward from the Antarctic Plateau to the north of Trinity Nunatak and the Kirkwood Range, to enter the Ross Sea, where it forms the Nordenskjöld Ice Tongue. The glacier was first mapped by the British Antarctic Expedition (1907–09) and named for Douglas Mawson, the expedition physicist, who later led two other Antarctic expeditions, 1911–14, and 1929–31.

Reckling Peak is located at the icefalls at the head of Mawson Glacier, which also produced Reckling Moraine. Both Shultz Peak and Mount Armytage are south of the glacier. Battlements Nunatak is near its head.

References

Glaciers of Victoria Land
Scott Coast